Eli Smith (born September 13, 1801, in Northford, Connecticut, to Eli and Polly (Whitney) Smith, and died January 11, 1857, in Beirut, Lebanon) was an American Protestant missionary and scholar. He graduated from Yale College in 1821 and from Andover Theological Seminary in 1826. He worked in Malta until 1829, then in company with H. G. O. Dwight traveled through Armenia and Georgia to Persia.  They published their observations, Missionary Researches in Armenia, in 1833 in two volumes. Eli Smith settled in Beirut in 1833.

Along with Edward Robinson, he made two trips to the Holy Land in 1838 and 1852, acting as an interpreter for Robinson in his quest to identify and record biblical place names in Palestine, which was subsequently published in Robinson's Biblical Researches in Palestine.

He is known for bringing the first printing press with Arabic type to Syria. He went on to pursue the task which he considered to be his life's work: translation of the Bible into Arabic. Although he died before completing the task, the work was completed by C. V. Van Dyck of the Syrian Mission and published in 1860 to 1865.

He married three times. Sarah Lanman Huntington Smith b. June 18, 1802 in Norwich, CT to Jabez and Mary (Lanman) Huntington and died Sept. 30, 1836 in Smyrna, Izmir, Turkey (m.July 21, 1833 in Beirut, Lebanon) was also a missionary; Maria Ward (Chapin) Smith b. May 31, 1819 in Rochester, N.Y. to Moses and Esther Maria (Ward) Chapin and died May 27, 1842 in Beirut, Lebanon (m. March 9, 1841 in Rochester, N.Y.); and Mehitable (Hetty) Simkins (Butler) Smith b. Sep. 15, 1816 to Daniel and Elizabeth Butler and died July 26, 1893 in Lyons, Michigan (m. Oct. 7, 1846 in Northampton, MA), who was also a missionary. His daughter Mary Elizabeth Smith, was educated at the Female Seminaries in Hartford, Connecticut and Ipswich, Massachusetts and taught at the Female Seminary at Mt. Auburn, Cincinnati.  She was listed In the Women's Who's Who of America by John William Leonard 1914–1915.

References

Further reading 
 A biographical article."
Haim Goren, 'The loss of a minute is just so much loss of life': Edward Robinson and Eli Smith in the Holy Land, Brepols, 2020.

External links
Passport for Explorer of Jerusalem, Rev. Eli Smith Shapell Manuscript Foundation
 "Eli Smith", In: Dictionary of American Biography (1943), Vol. 17, p. 257-258

People from North Branford, Connecticut
American Protestant missionaries
1801 births
Yale College alumni
Translators of the Bible into Arabic
Protestant missionaries in Syria
Protestant missionaries in Malta
Protestant missionaries in Iran
Protestant missionaries in Armenia
Protestant missionaries in Palestine (region)
1857 deaths
19th-century American translators
American expatriates in the Ottoman Empire
Protestant missionaries in the Ottoman Empire
Protestant missionaries in Georgia (country)
Missionary linguists